Rodney Coleman Jarrett (born January 4, 1983) is a Canadian former professional ice hockey defenseman, who played one game in the National Hockey League (NHL) with the New York Islanders. As of 2021, he is an owner and the head coach of the Soo Thunderbirds in the Northern Ontario Junior Hockey League.

Playing career
As a youth, Jarrett played in the 1997 Quebec International Pee-Wee Hockey Tournament with a minor ice hockey team from Sault Ste. Marie, Ontario.

Jarrett played major junior hockey with the Plymouth Whalers of the Ontario Hockey League before he was drafted 141st overall in the 2001 NHL Entry Draft by the Columbus Blue Jackets. He was later signed to a three-year entry level contract and played one National Hockey League game with the New York Islanders during the 2005–06 NHL season.

After a year with the Eisbären Berlin in the Deutsche Eishockey Liga Jarrett signed with HPK in the Finnish SM-liiga. He completed his tryout contract with HPK and subsequently signed another with Jokerit. He was released by Jokerit in January, and signed for Malmö Redhawks of the Swedish second-tier Allsvenskan.

Jarrett continued his journeyman European career in Austria with the Graz 99ers of the EBEL before experiencing a year in Japanese hockey with the Tohoku Free Blades of the Asian League.

Jarrett returned to Austria to establish roots and captain the Graz 99ers for the next two seasons, before signing a two-year contract with EBEL rivals Villacher SV on March 15, 2013.

After two seasons in Villacher, Jarrett returned to Japan as a free agent for a second stint with the Tohoku Free Blades on July 22, 2015. On 26 July 2017, Jarrett moved to the UK to sign for EIHL side Belfast Giants, ending his 15 year professional career with the club.

Career statistics

Regular season and playoffs

International

See also
List of players who played only one game in the NHL

References

External links

1983 births
Belfast Giants players
Bridgeport Sound Tigers players
Canadian ice hockey defencemen
Columbus Blue Jackets draft picks
Eisbären Berlin players
Graz 99ers players
HPK players
Sportspeople from Sault Ste. Marie, Ontario
Jokerit players
Living people
Malmö Redhawks players
New York Islanders players
Plymouth Whalers players
Sinupret Ice Tigers players
Tohoku Free Blades players
EC VSV players
Ice hockey people from Ontario
Canadian expatriate ice hockey players in Northern Ireland
Canadian expatriate ice hockey players in Austria
Canadian expatriate ice hockey players in Finland
Canadian expatriate ice hockey players in Germany
Canadian expatriate ice hockey players in Sweden
Canadian expatriate ice hockey players in the United States
Canadian expatriate ice hockey players in Japan